Bakkani Narasimhulu is an Indian politician belonging to the state of Telangana. He was the president of the Telangana unit of the Telugu Desam Party (abbreviated TDP) from 2021 to 2022 and a senior TDP leader from Mahabubnagar district.

Political career
Bakkani Narasimhulu started his political career in 1983 as an ordinary political activist in the Telugu Desam Party. He worked in various capacities in the joint Mahabubnagar district-TDP unit. Narasimhulu contested the 1994 Andhra Pradesh Assembly elections as a Telugu Desam Party candidate from Shadnagar constituency and won against his nearest rival Congress Party candidate P. Shankar Rao with a majority of 45822 votes and entered the assembly for the first time as an MLA.

In 1999 he refrained from contesting in the legislative assembly election of Andhra Prdesh as this seat was allotted to Bharatiya Janata Party(abbreviated BJP) as a part of TDP & BJP alliance in the respective elections. Later in 2004 he contested in the legislative assembly election of Andhra Pradesh from Shadnagar Assembly constituency as a TDP candidate and lost to his nearest rival Congress Party candidate P. Shankara Rao by a margin of 10632 votes.

Later, he was in-charge of Shadnagar Constituency of Telugu Desam Party, TDP State Secretary, Executive Secretary, SC Cell State President, TTD Governing Body Member, TDP Election Committee Member, Disciplinary Committee Member and Joint Mahabubnagar District TDP President until it got divided into Jogulamba Gadwal district, Wanaparthy district, Nagarkurnool district, and itself as Mahabubnagar district. He worked as a member of the national executive committee and as the national general secretary of TDP. Bakkani Narasimhu contested the 2014 parliamentary elections as a TDP candidate from the Nagarkurnool Lok Sabha constituency and was defeated.

Narsimhulu was appointed as Telangana Telugu Desam Party State President on 19 July 2021.

Personal life
Bakkani Narasimhulu was born in Lingareddy Guda village, Farooqnagar Mandal, Rangareddy District, Telangana state. He completed his tenth standard in 1970 from Zilla Parishad High School, Farooqnagar

References

Andhra Pradesh MLAs 1994–1999
Telugu Desam Party politicians
National Democratic Alliance candidates in the 2014 Indian general election
Telugu politicians
Year of birth missing (living people)
Living people